Antal Béla Babai (April 27, 1914 – October 1, 1997) was an ethnic Romani musician and interpreter of romani music. Babai was born in Austria-Hungarian Empire and emigrated to the United States late 1930s, where he became famous as "The King of the Gypsy Violin".

Babai was born in Graz, Austria-Hungary and grew up in Kaposvár near a large community of Romani. He learned to play the violin at a young age. At age 12 he would play in a local cafe, and in later years he would keep a clipping about those performances.

After he emigrated to the United States in 1937, he noticed that the music from his country was played in Hungarian restaurants. Babai started an orchestra in which he played the violin, accompanied by a kontras (second fiddler), a bratchas (violist), a bogos (double bass), a cimbalom-player, and a cellist.

In 1953 he left Chicago for New York, where he performed in the Waldorf-Astoria Hotel.

Babai was married to Emma Horvath, who was of Bashalde Romani descent, and had a son and two daughters. He died in Nesconset, New York.

Discography
An Evening in Budapest with Bela Babai (1934)
Gypsy Moods
Gypsy Love (1957) (as Bela Babai and his Orchestra)
An Evening at Chardas (as Bela Babai and his Fiery Gypsies)
Frénésie Tzigane (as Bella Babaï)
Gypsy Panorama 
Spiel Für Mich, Zigeuner! (as Bela Babai und sein Ungarisches Ensemble)
Play For Me Gypsy (as Bela Babai and his Hungarian Ensemble)
Haunting Hungarian Melodies (as Bela Babai and his Gypsy Orchestra)
Let The Gypsies Play ("Cigányok Játszanak" Request Records, New Rochelle, NY)

References

Rate Your Music: "Bela Babai"
Discogs.com: "Bela Babai"

1914 births
1997 deaths
Musicians from Graz
People from Kaposvár
Romani music
Romanian emigrants to the United States
American bandleaders
People from Nesconset, New York
20th-century American musicians
American people of Romani descent